Đàm Quang Trung (September 12, 1921 – March 3, 1995)  was a Vietnamese general in the People's Army of Vietnam. He served in the First Indochina War and Vietnam War.

Đàm Quang Trung joined the Communist Party of Vietnam in 1939. In 1940 he was imprisoned by French colonial authorities, but was released shortly thereafter. In September 1944, he began building a guerrilla warfare on the northern border of the country to China. In December, he joined the communist guerrilla movement. During the August Revolution in 1945, he served as a company commander of Việt Minh in the seizure of power in Thái Nguyên. After the founding of the Democratic Republic of Vietnam (North Vietnam) he took over again a command of a company but was also the chief officer for the special zone Hanoi. During the first Indochina War, he rose to the rank of general. From 1946 to 1954 he was commander of the Inter-zone V. From 1953 to 1954 he was deputy commander of the 312th Infantry Division.

References 

1921 births
1995 deaths
Vietnamese generals
Tày people
Members of the 4th Central Committee of the Communist Party of Vietnam
Members of the 5th Central Committee of the Communist Party of Vietnam
Members of the 6th Central Committee of the Communist Party of Vietnam